Chersias of Orchomenus (fl. late 7th century BCE) was an archaic Greek epic poet whose work is all but lost today. Plutarch presents Chersias as an interlocutor in the Banquet of the Seven Sages, making him a contemporary of Periander and Chilon. Chersias is also said to have been present when Periander's father Cypselus dedicated a treasury at Delphi. According to Pausanias, Chersias' poetry had already fallen out of circulation by his day, but the geographer quotes the only extant fragment of his epic poetry, citing a speech delivered by Callippus of Corinth (5th century BCE) to the Orchomenians as the source:

This fragment suggests that Chersias, like his apparent contemporary Asius of Samos, composed in the genre of genealogical epic best represented today by the fragmentary Hesiodic Catalogue of Women. Pausanias goes on to relate that Chersias composed the epitaph which the Orchomenians inscribed upon the base of a statue they erected in Hesiod's honor:

References

Bibliography
 .
 . (Greek text with facing English translation)

Ancient Greek poets
7th-century BC poets
Ancient Greek epic poets
Early Greek epic poets
Culture of ancient Boeotia